Khor Royal Cup is the fifth-highest level of club football competition which competed in the tournament in Thailand since 1963. It was founded by Football Association of Thailand along with Ngor Royal Cup in 1963. Department of Physical Education was the first team to win this competition.

In 1996, Khor Royal Cup was downgraded to be the fourth-tier football tournament of Thai club football competition when Football Association of Thailand founded Thai Division 1 League as the second-tier in its place. Finally, in 2006, the tournament was downgraded to be the fifth-tier tournament due to the proposed merger of the Provincial League and Thai Premier League into one entity.

In 2016, Khor Royal Cup was combined to Regional League Division 3 completely along with Khǒr Royal Cup and Ngor Royal Cup by Football Association of Thailand and then Khor Royal Cup become a trophy  for Regional League Division 2.

Tournament format 
The clubs which are still in the division and the best eight clubs from the previous edition of Ngor Royal Cup join the tournament. The first round is group stage, and the clubs will be divided into a group of 3 or 4 clubs. The winners and the runners-up of each groups qualify to the knock-out stage. Only the best four or the semi-finalist clubs of the tournament promote to Khǒr Royal Cup next season while the clubs which withdraw themselves from the tournament will be relegated to Ngor Royal Cup next season.

List of winners 

Note: 1. 2013-14 Khor Royal Cup was delayed due to 2013–14 Thai political crisis.

References 

Football competitions in Thailand